This list of Alabama tornado events includes notable storms which affected the US state of Alabama. Because it is not always simple to determine if damage was caused by multiple tornadoes or by a single tornado moving across an area, then the list includes the overall tornado events. Several events also affected other U.S. states.

The following is a partial list, by month and year:
 February 1884: Enigma tornado outbreak (10 counties)
 March 1920: 1920 Palm Sunday tornado outbreak (4 counties)
 May 1929: 1929 Rye Cove, Virginia tornado outbreak
 March 1932: 1932 Deep South tornado outbreak
 April 1936: 1936 Tupelo–Gainesville tornado outbreak
 April 1956: April 1956 Birmingham tornado
 April 1957: April 1957 Southeastern United States tornado outbreak
 1974: 1974 Super Outbreak
 January 1975: Great Storm of 1975
 April 1977: April 1977 Birmingham tornado
 November 1989: November 1989 tornado outbreak (Huntsville)
 November 1992: November 1992 tornado outbreak
 March 1994: 1994 Palm Sunday tornado outbreak (8 counties)
 May 1995: May 1995 Tornado Outbreak Sequence (Huntsville)
 April 1998: April 1998 Birmingham tornado
 December 2000: December 2000 Tuscaloosa tornado
 November 2001: Arkansas–Mississippi–Alabama tornado outbreak
 November 2002: 2002 Veterans Day Weekend tornado outbreak
 August 2005: Hurricane Katrina tornado outbreak
 November 2005: Late-November 2005 tornado outbreak
 September 2006: Late-September 2006 tornado outbreak
 November 2006: Mid-November 2006 tornado outbreak
 March 2007: February–March 2007 tornado outbreak
 January 2008: January 2008 tornado outbreak sequence
 February 2008: 2008 Super Tuesday tornado outbreak
 April 2009: April 2009 tornado outbreak
 April 2010: Tornado outbreak of April 22–25, 2010
 April 2011: 2011 Super Outbreak (19 counties)
 December 2012: Late December 2012 North American storm complex (14 counties)
March 2019: Tornado outbreak of March 3, 2019

The above list is a partial roster, including links to related articles which provide more details about each tornado event.

References